Zhou Junchen (born 23 March 2000) is a Chinese footballer who currently plays as a winger for Qingdao Huanghai on loan from Shanghai Shenhua.

Club career
Zhou Junchen joined Chinese Super League side Shanghai Shenhua's youth academy in March 2018 when Shenhua bought Genbao Football Base's U19 teams. He was promoted to the first team squad in the summer break of 2018. On 18 July 2018, Zhou made his senior debut in a league match against Tianjin Teda, replacing Cao Yunding in the 80th minute, making him the second player born in the new millennium to make an appearance in the Chinese Super League  (after Zhang Aokai in 2016). He assisted Demba Ba's winning goal one minute after coming on as a substitute. Zhou would be in violation of the national teams discipline on 8 September 2018 when he represented China U20 for the GSB Bangkok Cup. On 17 September 2018, he was banned from national teams and suspended for one year from 9 September 2018 to 8 September 2019 for all competitions organized by Chinese Football Association. On 11 April 2019 his suspension was dropped after he apologised for going out for dinner and breaking the teams curfew without permission while on international duty. On 12 April 2019 he made his return for Shenhua in a league game against Guangzhou R&F as a late substitute for Wang Wei, which ended in a 2-1 defeat. On 28 February 2020 he joined newly promoted Qingdao Huanghai on loan for the start of the 2020 Chinese Super League.

Career statistics
.

Honours

Club
Shanghai Shenhua
Chinese FA Cup: 2019

References

External links
 

2000 births
Living people
Chinese footballers
Footballers from Shanghai
Shanghai Shenhua F.C. players
Qingdao F.C. players
Chinese Super League players
Association football midfielders